Trinity Regional Medical Center (TRMC) is a regional medical center located in Fort Dodge, Iowa.  The hospital has 200 licensed beds, and in addition provides support to a number of smaller hospitals in northwest Iowa.  The hospital is affiliated with UnityPoint Health.

TRMC provides emergency, obstetrical, pediatric, general medical, and intensive care services as well as an outpatient surgical service.  Previously TRMC also had a psychiatric department, however a lack of physicians forced the hospital to close the department.

Fort Dodge, Iowa
UnityPoint Health